The Journal of Religious History is an international peer-reviewed academic journal published by Wiley-Blackwell on behalf of the Religious History Association. It covers current work in the history of religions. It also examines the relation of religions with other aspects of human experience.

Abstracting and indexing 
The journal is abstracted and indexed by Academic Search Elite, FRANCIS, America: History & Life, Australian Public Affairs Information Service, Arts and Humanities Citation Index, ATLA Religion Database, CSA Biological Sciences Database, CSA Environmental Sciences & Pollution Management Database, Current Contents/Arts & Humanities, Ecology Abstracts, Historical Abstracts, InfoTrac, ProQuest, and Sociological Abstracts.

References

External links 
 
 Religious History Association

Publications established in 1960
Religion history journals
Wiley (publisher) academic journals
Quarterly journals
English-language journals